Club Patí Voltregà is a Catalan rink hockey club from Sant Hipòlit de Voltregà, Osona established in 1955, currently competing in the OK Liga and the OK Liga Femenina.

History
The club enjoyed its golden age between 1960 and 1977; through these years Voltregà won three European Cups, three OK Liga and five national cups. Its best years were 1975 and 1976, when they were both Spanish and European champions. The team's only major trophy in subsequent years was the 2002 CERS Cup.

On the other hand, its women's team has been highly successful in the recent years; it has won triples in 2008 and 2011, including two European Leagues. The years 2016 and 2017 are particularly successful as the girls win back to back the European League, in addition to this, they win the 2015–16 OK Liga and the Copa de la Reina in 2017.

Season to season

Men's team

Women's team

Trophies

Men's
European Cup: 3
1966, 1975, 1976
CERS Cup: 1
2002
Spanish Championship: 3
1965, 1975, 1976
Spanish Cup: 5
1960, 1965, 1969, 1974, 1977
Lliga Catalana: 1
1990–91
Nations Cup: 1
1961

Women's
European League: 6
2008, 2011, 2013, 2016, 2017, 2019
Spanish League: 5
2011, 2012, 2013, 2014, 2016
Former Spanish Championship: 5
2003, 2005, 2006, 2007, 2008
Spanish Cup (Copa de la Reina): 6
2006, 2007, 2008, 2011, 2014, 2017
Lliga Catalana: 7
2002–03, 2003–04, 2004–05, 2005–06, 2006–07, 2007–08, 2008–09

References

External links
Official website

Sports clubs established in 1955
Catalan rink hockey clubs
Sports clubs in Barcelona
1955 establishments in Spain